Ubay Luzardo Santana (born 6 November 1983) is a Spanish footballer who plays for Arucas CF mainly as a central defender.

Club career

Early years and Kitchee
Born in Las Palmas, Canary Islands, Luzardo came through local UD Las Palmas' youth system, but never represented the senior team. During his early spell in his country, he played only in Tercera División or lower.

In July 2009, Luzardo signed a three-year contract with Hong Kong side Kitchee SC. He appeared in 36 First Division games with seven goals over his first two seasons, winning the national championship in the latter and qualifying to the 2011 Premier League Asia Trophy, where he scored an own goal against Chelsea in the semi-finals and missed a penalty kick in the third-place play-off 0–3 loss to Blackburn Rovers.

Luzardo scored straight off the bench to make it 3–2 for Kitchee against Tai Po FC, before reverting to his usual centre back position.

Melbourne Victory
In January 2012, Luzardo was invited to trial with Melbourne Victory FC in the A-League. Coach Jim Magilton said: "I like what I saw. I saw a few games pre-season, he played against Chelsea and Blackburn and I like what I see". On 8 February, he signed a loan deal with the club until the end of the campaign.

On 10 March 2012, in the match against Sydney FC, Luzardo was adjudged to have brought down Bruno Cazarine in a 32nd-minute off-the-ball tussle in the box. The conceded penalty resulted in Sydney's 1–0 win, which put an official end to Victory's finals hopes. He subsequently returned to Kitchee only to be released, and went on to play professionally in Sweden and Portugal, with a brief amateur spell with Ebbsfleet United in between.

Luzardo alternated between the Portuguese Segunda Liga and his country's lower leagues in the following years.

References

External links

Official website

1983 births
Living people
Footballers from Las Palmas
Spanish footballers
Association football defenders
Association football forwards
Association football utility players
Segunda División B players
Tercera División players
Real Murcia Imperial players
UD Socuéllamos players
Recreativo de Huelva players
CD Ebro players
CD San Roque de Lepe footballers
Hong Kong First Division League players
Kitchee SC players
A-League Men players
Melbourne Victory FC players
Superettan players
Assyriska FF players
National League (English football) players
Ebbsfleet United F.C. players
Liga Portugal 2 players
S.C. Farense players
S.C. Olhanense players
Spanish expatriate footballers
Expatriate footballers in Hong Kong
Expatriate soccer players in Australia
Expatriate footballers in Sweden
Expatriate footballers in England
Expatriate footballers in Portugal
Spanish expatriate sportspeople in Hong Kong
Spanish expatriate sportspeople in Australia
Spanish expatriate sportspeople in Sweden
Spanish expatriate sportspeople in England
Spanish expatriate sportspeople in Portugal